Nyack High School is a secondary school serving parts of the Town of Orangetown and Town of Clarkstown, New York, United States. The original Nyack High School building is now part of BOCES. Since 1990, Nyack High School has been located less than a mile north of the old facility, at the corner of Christian Herald Road and Highland Avenue-(U.S. Route 9W).

Nyack High School is the sole high school in the Nyack Union Free School District in New York. Students come to the high school from Nyack Middle School, which gathers students from Upper Nyack, Liberty, Hilltop (now closed) and Valley Cottage elementary schools.

The high school is known for its academic performance with 94 percent of seniors taking the SAT in 2004, its football team, its theatrical productions and its music program.

In 1972, one of its school buses were involved in an accident getting struck by a Penn Central freight train, which killed five students and injured 46.

Activities

Academic League
Amnesty International
Asian Club
ASPIRA
Band
Drama Club
Chess Club
Cross Country
Ecology Club
Field Hockey
French Club/French Honor Society
Future Business Leaders of America
Gay-Straight Alliance
Haitian Culture Club
Indianettes
Interact
Leadership Partnership Program [LPP]
Math League/NY State
Math League/Rockland
Men's a cappella group
Mock Trial Team
Moot court
National Art Honor Society
National Honor Society
Nyack Spectrum
Orchestra
Chamber Orchestra 
SADD
Science Honor Society
Science Olympiad
Ski Club
Spanish Club/Spanish Honor Society
Students Opposing Starvation [SOS]
Symphony Orchestra
Tower Yearbook
Tri-M
Video Club
Youth Against Cancer
Young Ambassadors

Sports

Fall

Sports in the Fall for Nyack High School students include:

Varsity Boys and Girls Cross Country,
Varsity Field Hockey
Varsity Boys Soccer
Varsity Girls Soccer
Varsity Girls Swimming
Varsity Girls Tennis
Varsity Volleyball
Varsity Cheer-leading
American Football

Winter
Sports in the Winter for Nyack High School students include:

Varsity Boys and Girls Fencing
Varsity Boys Basketball
Varsity Girls Basketball
Varsity Boys Swimming
Varsity Indoor Track
Varsity Wrestling

Spring
Sports in the Spring for Nyack High School students include:

Varsity Baseball
Varsity Golf
Varsity Boys Lacrosse
Varsity Girls Lacrosse
Varsity Softball
Varsity Boys Tennis
Varsity Girls and Boys Track and Field

School profile
enrollment:2950 students (in school system)

ethnic make-up

 9% Asian
24% Black
12% Hispanic
55% White

Average class size
Gr. 6-12 24

Notable alumni
Larry Abney, NBA player
George Beim, former professional soccer player 
Roger Brown, NFL player
Gloria Callen, backstroke swimmer 
Welles Crowther, worked in finance on the 104th floor of the South World Trade Center. Died on September 11 while saving at least eighteen lives. Also known as The Man in the Red Bandana
Adam Deitch, drummer and producer
Firth Haring Fabend, novelist and historian
Terrence Fede, NFL defensive end for the Buffalo Bills
Rupert Holmes, composer, singer-songwriter, musician and author
Edward Hopper, painter, 1899
 George Jakowenko, NFL player 
Elijah Reichlin-Melnick, former member of the New York State Senate
Jim Ridlon, former NFL player; sports painter and sculptor
Claudio Sanchez, member of Coheed and Cambria

References

External links
Nyack High School

Public high schools in New York (state)
Schools in Rockland County, New York